This is an alphabetical index of articles related to painting.

A 

 Abstract art
 Abstract expressionism
 Abstract illusionism
 Abstract impressionism
 Abstraction-Création
 Academic art
 Académie des Beaux-Arts
 Accidental damage of art
 Accidentalism
 Acrylic paint
 Acrylic painting techniques
 Action painting
 Aeropittura
 Afrasiab painting
 Aging
 Ainu genre painting
 Airbrush
 Akita ranga
 Algorithmic art
 Al-Qatt Al-Asiri
 All-over painting
 Altarpiece
 Amsterdam Impressionism
 Ancients
 Andokides painter
 Animal-made art
 Animalier
 Antwerp Mannerism
 Antwerp school
 Apulian vase painting
 Aquarelle
 Arabic miniature
 Architectural painting
 Argentine painting
 Argive vase painting
 Art conservation and restoration
 Art criticism 
 Art dealer
 Art of the United Kingdom
 Art of El Greco
 Arte Povera
 Artist
 Ashcan School
 Assemblage
 Astuvansalmi rock paintings
 Atelier
 Atmospheric perspective
 Authenticity in art
 Automatistes

B 

 Bad Painting
 Bahi rock paintings
 Balinese art
 Bamboccianti
 Bamboo painting
 Barbizon school
 Bark painting
 Baroque painting
 Bavarian State Painting Collections
 Bengal School of Art
 Bentvueghels
 Bergen School
 Bikaner style of painting
 Bilingual vase painting
 Binder
 Bird-and-flower painting
 Black-figure pottery
 Boeotian vase painting
 Bodegón
 Body painting
 Bolognese School
 Boston Expressionism
 Boston School
 Brazilian painting
 Brunaille
 Buon fresco
 Byzantine art

C 

 Ca' Dolfin Tiepolos
 Cabinet painting
 Caeretan hydria
 California Impressionism
 California Scene Painting
 Campanian vase painting
 Cangiante
 Canvas
 Capriccio
 Caravaggisti
 Carnation
 Casein paint
 Catalogue raisonné
 Catholic art
 Cave painting
 Cave paintings in India
 Caverna da Pedra Pintada
 Cheriyal scroll painting
 Chiaroscuro
 China painting
 Chinese painting
 Chinese porcelain in European painting
 Chinsō
 Cityscape
 Classical Realism
 Cloisonnism
 Cloudscape
 Cobweb painting
 Collage
 Color
 Color field
 Color realism
 Color theory (hue, tint, tone, value)
 Coloring book
 Colourist painting
 Combine painting
 Company style
 Composition
 Conservation and restoration of ancient Greek pottery
 Conservation and restoration of cultural heritage
 Conservation and restoration of frescos
 Conservation and restoration of painting frames
 Conservation and restoration of paintings
 Conservation and restoration of panel paintings
 Conservation and restoration of Pompeian frescoes
 Conservation-restoration of Leonardo da Vinci's The Last Supper
 Contemporary British Painting
 Costumbrismo
 Court painter
 Cradling
 Craquelure
 Crayon
 Cretan School
 Crucifixion in the arts
 Crystal Cubism
 Cubism
 Cubo-Futurism
 Cycladic vase painting
 Cynical realism
 Czech Cubism

D 

 Dada
 Danube school
 Deccan painting
 Decorative Impressionism
 Degenerate art
 Delft School
 Der Blaue Reiter
 Detachment of wall paintings
 Die Brücke
 Digital painting
 Diptych
 Distemper (paint)
 Divisionism
 Đông Hồ painting
 Donor portrait
 Doom paintings
 Double-sided painting
 Drawdown card
 Drawing
 Dress coat painting
 Drip painting
 Drybrush
 Drying oil
 Düsseldorf school of painting
 Dutch and Flemish Renaissance painting
 Dutch art
 Dutch Gift
 Dutch Golden Age painting

E 

 E-awase
 Eaismo
 Early Netherlandish painting
 Easel
 East Greek vase painting
 Eclecticism in art
 Edinburgh School
 Egg tempera
 Elements of art
 Emakimono
 En plein air
 Encaustic painting
 Ensō
 Etruscan vase painting
 Etude in Leningrad painting of 1940-1980s
 Euboean vase painting
 Ex-voto
 Exposition des primitifs flamands à Bruges
 Expressionism

F 

 Fairy painting
 Fat over lean
 Fauvism
 Faux painting
 Fayum mummy portraits
 Feast of the Gods
 Fedoskino miniature
 Fête galante
 Figura serpentinata
 Figuration Libre
 Figurative art 
 Figure drawing
 Figure painting 
 Figure painting (hobby)
 Figure study
 Fijnschilder
 Fine Art of Leningrad
 Fingerpaint
 Flatness
 Flemish Baroque painting
 Flemish Expressionism
 Flemish painting
 Folly (allegory)
 Fore-edge painting
 Fourth dimension in art
 Freehand brush work
 Free Secession
 French standard sizes for oil paintings
 Fresco
 Fresco-secco
 Frottage
 Fugitive pigment
 Futurist Painting: Technical Manifesto

G 

 Gambier Parry process
 Generación de la Ruptura
 Genre painting
 Geometric abstraction
 Gesso
 Giornata
 Glair
 Glasgow School
 Glaze
 Glue-size
 Gnathia vases
 Gongbi
 Gorodets painting
 Gothic art
 Gouache
 Grand manner
 Grisaille
 Group of Seven
 Gruppo dei Sei

H 

 Haboku
 Hagenbund
 Hague School
 Haiga
 Handscroll
 Hanging scroll
 Hanshan and Shide
 Hara school of painters
 Hard-edge painting
 Hasegawa school
 Heaven Style Painting
 Heidelberg School
 Hierarchy of genres
 Historic paint analysis
 History of Modern Turkish painting
 History of painting
 History painting
 Hyperrealism

I 

 Iconography
 Illusionism
 Illusionistic ceiling painting
 Illustration
 Impasto
 Impressionism
 Imprimatura
 Incised painting
 Indian painting
 Indigenous Australian art
 Informalism
 Ink
 Ink wash painting
 Inscape
 Intimism
 Intonaco
 Ionic vase painting
 Italian Baroque art
 Italian Renaissance painting
 Italian Rococo art

J 

Japanese painting

K 

 Kaigetsudō school
 Kakemono
 Kalighat painting
 Kangra painting
 Kanō school
 Katsukawa school
 Keim's process
 Kerala mural painting
 Kerch style
 Kinetic Pointillism
 Konstnärsförbundet
 Konstnärsförbundets skola
 Korean painting
 Kylix
 Kyoto school

L 

 Laconian vase painting
 Lacquer painting
 Landscape painting
 Landscape painting in Scotland
 Leaf painting
 Ledger art
 Leningrad painting of 1950-1980s (Saint Petersburg, 1994)
 Leningrad School of Painting
 Les Nabis
 Letras y figuras
 Licked finish
 Light painting
 Line
 Lining of paintings
 Live painting
 Local color
 Lost artworks
 Lüftlmalerei
 Lucan portrait of Leonardo da Vinci
 Lucanian vase painting
 Luminism (Impressionism)
 Lyrical abstraction

M 

 Macchiaioli
 Madhubani art
 Madonna
 Mannerism
 Mannerists
 Marine art
 Marouflage
 Masking
 Massurrealism
 Mastic
 Matte painting
 Maulstick
 May (painting)
 Megilp
 Merry company
 Metaphysical art
 Mexican muralism
 Michelangelo and the Medici
 Military art
 Mineral painting
 Mineral spirits
 Miniature art
 Minimalism
 Mischtechnik
 Mise en abyme
 Mixed media
 Model
 Modern art
 Modern European ink painting
 Modern expressionism
 Modern Indian painting
 Modernism
 Modular art
 Mogu
 Mold painting
 Rhodian vase painting
 Monochrome painting
 Motif
 Mouth and foot painting
 Mughal painting
 Mural
 Mural Paintings from the Herrera Chapel
 Mural paintings of the conquest of Majorca
 Mstyora miniature
 Mysore painting

N 

 Naïve art
 Namepiece
 Nanga
 Nanpin school
 Narrative art
 Nazarene movement
 Ndebele house painting
 Neoclassicism
 Neo-expressionism
 Neo-Fauvism
 Neo-figurative art
 Neo-impressionism
 Neo-minimalism
 Neo-pop
 Neo-primitivism
 Nepalese painting
 New European Painting
 New Leipzig School
 Night in paintings (Eastern art)
 Night in paintings (Western art)
 Nihonga
 Nikuhitsu-ga
 Nirmal paintings
 Nise-e
 Nishiki-e
 Nocturne (painting)
 Northern Mannerism 
 Norwich School of painters
 Nouveau réalisme
 Novgorod School
 Nuagisme
 Nude

O 

 Objective abstraction
 Ogoe
 Oil on copper
 Oil paint
 Oil painting
 Oil painting reproduction
 Oil pastel
 Oil sketch
 Olot school
 Op art
 Oriental carpets in Renaissance painting
 Orientalism
 Orientalizing period
 Orphism
 Overdoor
 Overpainting

P 

 Paestan vase painting
 Pahari painting
 Paint
 Paintbrush
 Paint by number
 Painterliness
 Painterly
 Painterwork
 Painting
 Painting and Patronage
 Painting in Space
 Painting in the Americas before European colonization
 Painting of Lady Tjepu
 Paintings attributed to Caravaggio
 Paintings by Adolf Hitler
 Paintings conservator
 Paintings from Arlanza
 Paintings from El Burgal
 Paintings of 1940-1990s: the Leningrad School
 Paintings of Amsterdam by Vincent van Gogh
 Paintings on masonite
 Palette
 Panel painting
 Papier collé
 Paris Salon
 Pastel
 Palette
 Palette knife
 Panorama
 Panoramic painting
 Passionism
 Patna School of Painting
 Pen painting
 Pencil crayon
 Pendant painting
 Pentimento
 Persian miniature
 Perspective
 Petrykivka painting
 Phad painting
 Photorealism
 Picasso's African Period
 Picasso's Blue Period
 Picasso's Rose Period
 Picture frame
 Pigment
 Pinxit
 Pithora
 Pitsa panels
 Plafond
 Plains hide painting
 Plastic arts
 Plasticiens
 Pointillism
 Polyptych
 Pompeian Styles
 Pont-Aven School
 Pop art
 Portrait
 Portrait miniature
 Portrait painting
 Portrait painting in Scotland
 Portraits by Vincent van Gogh
 Portraits of Shakespeare
 Portuguese contemporary art
 Post-Impressionism
 Post-painterly abstraction
 Poster paint
 Poussinists and Rubenists
 Precisionism
 Predella
 Pre-Raphaelite Brotherhood
 Prestezza
 Prime version
 Primer
 Primitivism
 Private collection
 Problem picture
 Pronkstilleven
 Prostitution in Impressionist painting
 Proto-Cubism
 Protoquadro
 Provenance
 Pulled string painting
 Purism

Q 
 Quadro riportato
 Quattrocento
 Quito School

R 

 Rag painting
 Ragamala paintings
 Rajput painting
 Raking light
 Rasa Renaissance
 Rayonism
 Realism (art movement)
 Realism (arts)
 Red-figure pottery
 Regionalism
 Renaissance art
 Renaissance in the Low Countries
 Repoussoir
 Restoration of the Sistine Chapel frescoes
 Retablo
 Reverse glass painting
 Reverse perspective
 Rhodian vase painting
 Rinpa school
 Rissverklebung
 Rock art of the Iberian Mediterranean Basin
 Roman wall painting (200 BC–AD 79)
 Romanesque art
 Romanism
 Renaissance art
 Rococo
 Rosemåling
 Rückenfigur
 Rule of thirds
 Russian avant-garde
 Russian Futurism
 Russian icons
 Russian lacquer art
 Russian symbolism

S 

 Sacra conversazione
 Salon d'Automne
 Salon des Refusés
 Samian vase painting
 Sandpainting
 Saponification
 Saura painting
 Scenic painting
 School of Ferrara
 School of Fontainebleau
 Screen painting
 Scottish Colourists
 Scottish Renaissance painted ceilings
 Scottish genre art
 Scroll painting
 Section d'Or
 Self-portrait
 Self-portraits by Rembrandt
 Septych
 Sfumato
 Sgraffito
 Shading
 Shan shui
 Shaped canvas
 Shekhawati painting
 Shigajiku
 Shijō school
 Sienese School
 Sign painting
 Silk painting
 Sistine Chapel ceiling
 Six principles of Chinese painting
 Sketch
 Sketchbook
 Social realism
 Socialist realism
 Société des Artistes Indépendants
 Solvent
 Southern School
 Soviet sale of Hermitage paintings
 Spalliera
 Spanish art
 Spanish Eclecticism
 Spatial organization
 Spatialism
 Speed painting
 Spray painting
 Spring exhibition (Leningrad, 1969)
 Staffage
 Still life
 Still life paintings by Vincent van Gogh (Netherlands)
 Still life paintings by Vincent van Gogh (Paris)
 Still life paintings from the Netherlands, 1550-1720
 Strainer bar
 Street painting
 Stretcher bar
 Stroganov School
 Stuckism
 Study
 Style
 Style Louis XIV
 Sugar painting
 Suprematism
 Surrealism
 Surrealist automatism
 Synchromism
 Synthetism

T 

 Tachisme
 Tang dynasty painting
 Tarashikomi
 Tempera
 Tenebrism
 Thanjavur painting
 Texture
 Thangka
 The Eight
 Theft of The Weeping Woman from the National Gallery of Victoria
 Themes in Italian Renaissance painting
 Theorem stencil
 Theory of painting
 Thessalian vase painting
 Three-phase firing
 Tibetan Buddhist wall paintings
 Tingatinga
 Tints and shades
 Tipos del País
 Toba-e
 Tobacco and art
 Tole painting
 Tonalism
 Tondo
 Topographical tradition
 Torii school
 Tosa school
 Transfer of panel paintings
 Triptych
 Trompe-l'œil 
 Tronie
 Troubadour style
 Tumlehed rock painting
 Trump
 Tunisian collaborative painting
 Turpentine

U 

 Ukiyo-e
 Ukrainian avant-garde
 Underdrawing
 Underpainting
 Universal Flowering
 Utrecht Caravaggism

V 

 Vandalism of art
 Vanitas
 Varnish
 Veduta 
 Velvet painting
 Venetian painting
 Venetian Renaissance
 Verdaccio
 Verdaille
 Verismo
 Victorian painting
 Visage Painting and the Human Face in 20th Century Art
 Visual arts

W 

 Wall Paintings of Thera
 Wall painting in Turkey
 Warli painting
 Wash
 Wasli
 Watercolor painting
 Watercolor paper
 Western painting
 Wet-on-wet
 20th-century Western painting
 White ground technique
 Working in layers
 World landscape
 Wǔ Xíng painting

X

Y 
 Yamato-e
 Yōga
 Young British Artists

Z 
 Zhe school
 Zhostovo painting
 The Zouave

Lists

 Art movements
 Early Netherlandish painters
 Painters by name
 Painters by nationality
 Major paintings by Masaccio
 Most expensive paintings
by living artists
 National Treasures of Japan
 Paintings by Frédéric Bazille
 Paintings by Hieronymus Bosch
 Paintings by Gustave Caillebotte
 Paintings by Caravaggio
 Paintings by Paul Cézanne
 Paintings by Albrecht Dürer
 Paintings by Paul Gauguin
 Paintings by Frans Hals
 Paintings by Gustav Klimt
 Paintings by Édouard Manet
 Paintings by Edvard Munch
 Paintings by Camille Pissarro
 Paintings by Nicolas Poussin
 Paintings by Raphael
 Paintings by Rembrandt
 Paintings by Pierre-Auguste Renoir
 Paintings by Alfred Sisley
 Paintings by Johannes Vermeer
 Stolen paintings
 Stone Age art
 Works by Michelangelo
 Works by Henri Matisse  
 Works by Claude Monet 
 Works by Titian
 Works by Vincent van Gogh
 Works by Diego Velázquez

Category
 :Category:Painting

See also

 Outline of painting
 Outline of painting history

Painting topics
Painting